Mater Carmeli School - Novaliches, located at Sacred Heart Village, Novaliches, Quezon City, is a private Catholic educational institution owned and managed by the Carmelite Missionaries. It was founded in 1986 on a property adjacent to the Novitiate House of the Carmelite Missionaries in Quezon City. Its Latin name, which means Mother of Carmel, comes from the name of a coastal mountain range in northern Israel where a group of hermits established themselves towards the end of the 12th century AD and called themselves Brothers of Saint Mary on Mt. Carmel in honor of the Our Lady of Mount Carmel, the school's patroness. The school offers nursery, kindergarten, grade school, junior high school and senior high school. The school is also known as MCS.

Historical background

The creation of the school
Mater Carmeli School - Novaliches, located at Sacred Heart Village, Novaliches, Quezon City, is owned and managed by the Carmelite Missionaries of the Province of Fr. Francisco Palau, Philippines. It was founded in 1986 on a piece of property adjacent to the Novitiate House of the Carmelite Missionaries in Quezon City.

In 1982 when the Novitiate House was transferred to Sacred Heart Village, Novaliches, Quezon City, the sisters did not have in mind the founding of the school beside the Novitiate. Once the Novitiate House stood, people passing by the highway mistook it for a school and there were inquiries as to what grade levels were offered.

The homeowners of the village prodded the sisters to put up a school. The Sacred Heart Village Homeowners Association formalized their appeal by sending a letter of request to the Provincial Council of Carmelite Missionaries in the Philippines. It was granted by the General Council of Carmelite Missionaries in Rome, Italy. A feasibility study was made and Mater Carmeli School - Novaliches was born.

Early years
The school started its operation in June 1986 with 20 Kindergarten pupils under the tutelage of Sr. Flordeliza Presquito, Sr. Asuncion Villalba, and Reynaldo Duremdes, a janitor. While the construction of the school building in the adjacent lot was going on, morning class was held in a lent one-storey, two-room building intended to be classrooms of novices and junior sisters.

In June 1987, the second school year, two classes of Kindergarten and Prep were added, and one section for both grade one and two levels. They occupied the first floor of the building while construction of the second and third floor was underway.

Expansion
The finished buildings were named after the Carmelite luminaries like Our Lady of Mount Carmel, St. Teresa of Avila, and Blessed Francisco Palau. The last and the biggest building constructed was named Sinon Building, in honor of the school engineer, the late Leonardo Sinon. In late 2015, the school started construction of the St. Therese of the Child Jesus building, an expansion for senior high school students near the school gymnasium. The building was completed in 2017.

Information

Curriculum
The school follows the Enhanced Basic Education Curriculum (K to 12) by the DepEd, in compliance with Republic Act 10533. In 2016, the school offered the Science, Technology, Engineering and Mathematics (STEM) strand under the Academic Track. In 2017, the school started to offer the Humanities and Social Sciences (HUMSS) strand. Traditionally, for every year, for every grade there would be ~8 Honors, a Salutatorian and a Valedictorian, but starting SY 2017-1018 there would be The with Honors, The with High Honors and with Highest Honors all combined would equal to ~20 people. They are chosen by Average.

Admission of students
Students must pass the entrance examination and the interview conducted by the Guidance Counselor and by the Principal for grade school and high school, and by the Pre-school coordinator for Kindergarten and Preparatory school.

Religious formation
School recollections for students are held once during the year. A three-day retreat is provided to graduating students and their parents, and for the faculty and non-teaching staff. This is held at the Carmelite Missionaries Center for Spirituality at Tagaytay.

There is a monthly celebration of the Sacraments, such as grade/year level celebration of the Eucharist and the Sacrament of Reconciliation.

Faculty, non-teaching staff, and service operators have their regular spiritual formation. They enter into spiritual exercises at the start of the school year. Advent and Lenten seasons are given inputs for their spiritual growth. They are sustained by their weekly "faith sharing" in their respective organized BECs (Basic Ecclesial Communities).

Parents are invited to the two-day parenting recollection-seminar in their child respective grade/year level called Hakbang Tungo sa Mabisang Pamamaraan ng Pagkamagulang.

School Quality 
The sections of each level are all named after Values (K-Gr. 10) / People (Gr. 11 & 12). The sections do have banners of the School's Values, a cross and an altar. Each section has ~40 students per year.

Administrative Staff

Grade School Principal
Sr. Dolores S. Buot (+), CM
Sr. Flordeliza S. Presquito, CM
Sr. Lourdes B. Dizon, CM
Sr. Ma. Adelaida C. Larupay, CM
Mrs. Ma. Erlinda M. Cachero(+)
Sr. Ma. Adelaida C. Larupay, CM
Sr. Lourdes B. Dizon, CM
Mr. Francisco B. Tabifranca Jr.
Mrs. Rosana G. Cruda

High School Principal
Sr. Lourdes B. Dizon, CM
Sr. Ma. Adelaida C. Larupay, CM
Sr. Carmelita C. Denoyo, CM
Mr. Francisco B. Tabifranca Jr.
Ms. Rosemarie G. Hizon (+)
Mr. Francisco B. Tabifranca Jr.

Senior High School Principal
Mrs. Noreen M. Morales

Sister schools
Mater Carmeli School is a Catholic school owned by the Carmelite Missionaries. Sister schools are located in the following areas:
Mater Carmeli School, D. Tuazon
Location: D. Tuazon Ave., Quezon City
Levels Offered: Kinder to Grade 6
Mater Carmeli School, Dingle
Location: Dingle, Iloilo
Levels Offered: Nursery, Kinder, Prep, Grade School and High School
Holy Cross of Caburan
Location: Caburan, Davao del Sur

The Foundation Day of the school is celebrated in the first week of November. The culmination of the yearly celebrations is on November 7 in commemoration of the feast day of Blessed Francisco Palau, the school's patron.

References
Citations

Bibliography
 Mater Carmeli School Novaliches official website
 Mater Carmeli School - Novaliches Profile at DepEd Philippines
 MCS @ Wikimapia
 MCS Taekwondo Club

Catholic elementary schools in Metro Manila
Catholic secondary schools in Metro Manila
Schools in Quezon City
Educational institutions established in 1986
1986 establishments in the Philippines